Addicted to Fame is a 2012 American documentary comedy film directed by David Giancola. The film stars Anna Nicole Smith, David Giancola, John James, Chyna, Larry King, Jesse Eisenberg and Sean Astin.

Cast
 Anna Nicole Smith
 David Giancola
 John James
 Chyna
 Larry King
 Jesse Eisenberg
 Sean Astin
 Bruce Campbell
 O. J. Simpson
 Harvey Levin
 Howard K. Stern
 Scott J. Jones
 Lenise Sorén
 Daniel Smith
 Kevin Costner
 Clint Eastwood
 Brooke Shields
 Billy Ray Cyrus
 Tyra Banks
 Charles Gibson
 Mary Hart

References

External links
 
 

2012 films
American documentary films
American comedy films
2012 comedy films
2010s English-language films
2010s American films